The two Treblinka trials concerning the Treblinka extermination camp personnel began in 1964. Held at Düsseldorf in West Germany, they were the two judicial trials in a series of similar war crime trials held during the early 1960s, such as the Jerusalem Adolf Eichmann trial (1961) and the Frankfurt Auschwitz Trials (1963–65), as a result of which the general public came to realize the extent of the crimes that some two decades earlier had been perpetrated in occupied Poland by German bureaucrats and their willing executioners. In the subsequent years, separate trials dealt with personnel of the Bełżec (1963–65), Sobibor (1966), and Majdanek (1975–81) extermination camps.

Hirtreiter trial
In 1946 Josef Hirtreiter was arrested in the course of the Allied investigations into the killing of disabled persons in the Hadamar killing centre. Although not focused on Treblinka from the beginning, and not serving as an lead-in to the later Treblinka trials, the Hirtreiter trial is viewed by some historians as being part of these. Hirtreiter could not be shown to have been criminally involved at Hadamar; however, he did confess to having worked in a camp near the Polish village of Małkinia where Jews were killed in a gas chamber. Further investigations showed that Hirtreiter had been stationed at the Treblinka extermination camp, where he supervised the victims' disrobing prior to their gassing. He was charged with participation in the mass-murder of Jews, particularly the killing of more than 10 persons, including infants. On 3 March 1951 Hirtreiter was sentenced to life imprisonment (released in 1977).

First Treblinka trial
The crimes committed in the General Government territory of occupied Poland were investigated by the Central Agency from July 1959 by the German specialist in the Nazi prosecution Dietrich Zeug, present at the Eichmann trial. His inquiry led to the first arrest of Treblinka deputy commandant on 2 December 1959. Zeug received survivor testimonies from Yad Vashem which allowed him to examine German national archives for more clues. He was the first to establish the chain of command for Operation Reinhard.

The first Treblinka trial began on 12 October 1964 and concerned eleven members of the SS camp personnel, or about a quarter of the total number of SS employed in the extermination of Jews brought aboard Holocaust trains to Treblinka. More than 100 witnesses were called, with incriminating evidence presented by Franciszek Ząbecki, a dispatcher employed by the Reichsbahn during the Holocaust train departures from across occupied Poland, proven by original German waybills he collected. The verdicts were pronounced on 3 September 1965:

Second Treblinka trial
The second Treblinka trial also known as the Stangl trial, was held from 13 May to 22 December 1970, five years after the first group trial for war crimes. In this trial, camp commandant Franz Stangl, expelled three years earlier from Brazil, finally stood accused. Stangl had previously assisted in killing handicapped people during Aktion T4 (the Nazi "euthanasia" programme), and, before moving on to Treblinka, had been the first commandant of Sobibor. Under his supervision, most of the Treblinka killings took place. He was sentenced to life imprisonment, and died in prison on 28 June 1971, during the appeal case.

See also
 Belsen trial in 1945 of the SS functionaries from Auschwitz and Bergen-Belsen 
 Belzec trial in the mid-1960s of eight former SS members of Belzec extermination camp
 Chełmno trials of the Chełmno extermination camp personnel, held in Poland and in Germany. The cases were decided almost twenty years apart
 Dachau trials held within the walls of the former Dachau concentration camp, 1945–1948
 Euthanasia trials, an overview of trials dealing specifically with the associated Nazi euthanasia programme
 Majdanek trials, the longest Nazi war crimes trial in history, spanning over 30 years
 Mauthausen-Gusen camp trials
 Nuremberg trials of the 23 most important leaders of the Third Reich, 1945–1946
 Hamburg Ravensbrück trials
 Sobibor trial held in Hagen, Germany in 1965 against the SS-men of the Sobibor extermination camp
 Ivan the Terrible (Treblinka guard), notorious Treblinka guard not brought to trial. In the 1970s-80s John Demjanjuk was accused of being Ivan and brought to trial in 1986, but eventually it was established that he was not the same person.

Notes

References
 
Erster Treblinka-Prozess (First Treblinka Trial): vol. 8, .
Zweiter Treblinka-Prozess (Second Treblinka Trial): vol. 22, .
Dritter Treblinka-Prozess (Third Treblinka Trial): vol. 34, .
 
 

 
Treblinka extermination camp
Holocaust trials
1965 in Germany
Crimes against humanity
Nazi war crimes in Poland